Rokdim Im Kokhavim ("Dancing with Stars") is the Israeli version of the popular British TV show Strictly Come Dancing. The show features local celebrities partnered with professional ballroom dancers, competing to be the most successful dancers in the contest. Each week the couple that gains the fewest votes from the show's judges and spectators is eliminated. Viewers vote for their favorites, in order to save them from elimination, via phone, SMS and online. Over 350,000 votes were cast on the show's 3rd-season finale.

Participants

Season 1

Season 2

Season 3

Season 4

Partners Lucy Dubinchik & Dennis Belochrekovski were forced to retire from the contest when Dennis suffered a herniated disk injury.

Season 5

In a twist in the competition after the fifth elimination, viewers were able to vote to reinstate their favourite of the five couples that had been eliminated. Orly Weinerman won, and was reinstated back into the contest, only to be re-eliminated by the public the next week. This twist created a controversy, however, when it allegedly emerged that contestants Pnina Rosenblum, Meital Dohan and Gala Kogan had already confirmed they had no plans to return to the programme under any circumstances, due to other commitments. Despite this, the phonelines to vote for the three contestants were kept open, at the expense of those voting by SMS. The Network responded that they had "operated according to policy", and would not confirm or deny the allegations to respect the "dignity of the stars".

Season 6

Season 7

Partners Ilanit & Haim Pershtein were forced to retire from the contest when Ilanit has a problem with her leg.

Season 8

Partners Bar Zomer & Matanel Kovansky were forced to retire from the contest when Bar has a serious injury.

Season 9

See also
 Dancing with the Stars

References

External links
 Official site
 

 
Channel 2 (Israeli TV channel) original programming
2005 Israeli television series debuts
2012 Israeli television series endings
2022 Israeli television series debuts
Dance competition television shows
2000s Israeli television series
2010s Israeli television series
Israeli television series based on British television series
Dance in Israel